Amboy Township is one of twenty-two townships in Lee County, Illinois, USA.  As of the 2010 census, its population was 3,108 and it contained 1,360 housing units.

Geography

Cities, towns, villages
 Amboy (east three-quarters)

Unincorporated towns
 Binghampton at 
(This list is based on USGS data and may include former settlements.)

Extinct towns
 Shelburn at 
(These towns are listed as "historical" by the USGS.)

Cemeteries
The township contains these four cemeteries: Binghampton, Mormon, Prairie Repose and Saint Patrick's.

Airports and landing strips
 Taylor Airport

Demographics

School districts
 Amboy Community Unit School District 272
 Ashton Community Unit School District 275

Political districts
 Illinois's 14th congressional district
 State House District 90
 State Senate District 45

References
 
 United States Census Bureau 2009 TIGER/Line Shapefiles
 United States National Atlas

External links
 City-Data.com
 Illinois State Archives
 Township Officials of Illinois

Townships in Lee County, Illinois
Populated places established in 1849
Townships in Illinois
1849 establishments in Illinois